David Ferrère (born 30 May 1974 in Saint-Denis, Réunion) is a retired French footballer. He last played as a midfielder for FC Avirons.

Career
Ferrère began his youth career with RC Paris before joining AS Beauvais as a sixteen-year-old at the start of the 1990s. Spending the majority of the decade with Beauvais, he moved on to CS Louhans-Cuiseaux in 1999, spending two years with the side. In early 2002, Ferrère joined Scottish side Motherwell, scoring a hat-trick on his debut during his short-term stay at Fir Park. Returning to France, Ferrère  played with Entente Sannois Saint-Gratien, FC Dieppe, SS Excelsior before joining FC Avirons.

Motherwell
After being released by CS Louhans-Cuiseaux in 2001, Ferrère was unable to find a new club and had been training with FC Metz. Motherwell manager Eric Black, who was previously a Metz player, became aware of Ferrère's availability and signed him on an 18-month contract. Ferrère played in ten Scottish Premier League matches and scored three goals for Motherwell, all of them coming in a hat-trick on his debut, as a second-half substitute, against Hibernian.

Ferrère was one of the 19 players made redundant when Motherwell entered administration less than three months later.

See also
List of Scottish Premier League hat-tricks

References

External links

1974 births
AS Beauvais Oise players
Louhans-Cuiseaux FC players
Expatriate footballers in Scotland
Association football midfielders
French expatriate footballers
French footballers
Ligue 2 players
Living people
Motherwell F.C. players
Racing Club de France Football players
Footballers from Réunion
Scottish Premier League players
Entente SSG players
FC Dieppe players